John Seymour Rutherford (27 February 1890 – 14 April 1943) was an English first-class cricketer. Rutherford was a right-handed batsman who bowled right-arm medium pace.

Rutherford made his first-class debut for Hampshire against Derbyshire in 1913. Rutherford represented the county in 8 first-class matches during the 1913 season, with his final appearance for the county coming against Nottinghamshire. In his 8 matches Rutherford scored 128 runs at a batting average of 9.14, with a high score of 33*. With the ball he took 3 wickets at a bowling average of 36.66.

Rutherford died at Oxford, Oxfordshire on 14 April 1943.

Family
Rutherford's brother Arnold Rutherford represented Hampshire in a single first-class match in 1912.

External links
Arnold Rutherford at Cricinfo
Arnold Rutherford at CricketArchive

1890 births
1943 deaths
People from Highclere
English cricketers
Hampshire cricketers